Mill Creek is a  long 2nd order tributary to Lanes Creek in Union County, North Carolina.

Course
Mill Creek rises about 4 miles northeast of Dudley, South Carolina in Chesterfield County.  Mill Creek then flows north into North Carolina to meet Lanes Creek about 1 mile northeast of Beulah Church.

Watershed
Mill Creek drains  of area, receives about 48.5 in/year of precipitation, has a topographic wetness index of 467.85 and is about 42% forested.

References

Rivers of North Carolina
Rivers of Union County, North Carolina
Rivers of Chesterfield County, South Carolina
Tributaries of the Pee Dee River